The 1929 World Table Tennis Championships men's singles was the third edition of the men's singles championship.

Fred Perry met Miklós Szabados in the final of this event. The latter won 14–21, 21–12, 23–21, 21–19.

Draw

Finals

References

-